An EMS provider's post-nominal (listed after the name) credentials usually follow his or her name in this order:
 Highest earned academic degree in or related to medicine, (e.g. "MD")
 Highest licensure or certification (e.g. "NRP")
 Further certifications (e.g. "CCEMT-P")

Generally, credentials are listed from most to least prestigious. A degree, once earned, cannot be taken away. Sometimes, licensure and certifications must be periodically renewed by examination or the completion of a prescribed number of continuing education units (CEUs).

EMS providers may also hold non-EMS credentials, including academic degrees. These are usually omitted unless they are related to the provider's job. For instance, a paramedic might not list an MBA, but a supervisor might choose to do so.

The provider's credentials are separated from the person's name (and from each other) with commas. There are usually no periods within the credentials (e.g. "EMT" not "E.M.T." or "PMD" not "Paramedic").

A
 AAS - Associate of Applied Science
 ACLS - Advanced Cardiac Life Support
 ACLS-EP - Advanced Cardiac Life Support for Experienced Providers
 ACLS-I - Advanced Cardiac Life Support Instructor
ACP - Advanced Care Paramedic (Canada)
ACP-F - Advanced Care Paramedic - Flight (Canada)
 AEMT - Advanced Emergency Medical Technician
AEMT-I- Advanced Emergency Medical Technician - Intermediate
AEMT-CC - Advanced Emergency Medical Technician - Critical Care
AMLS - Advanced Medical Life Support
AMLS-I - Advanced Medical Life Support Instructor
 ATLS - Advanced Trauma Life Support
 AWLS - Advanced Wilderness Life Support
 AEMSI - Assistant EMS Instructor

B
 B.EMS - Bachelor in Emergency Medical Services
 B.S EMS - Bachelor of Science in Emergency Medical Services
 BLS - Basic Life Support
 BLS-I - Basic Life Support Instructor
 B.S EHS- Bachelor of Science in Emergency Health Services
 B.S EHS Ed.- Bachelor of Science in Emergency Health Services Education (may also have an S. for Specialist)
 BSP - Bachelor of Science in Paramedicine  
 BTLS - Basic Trauma Life Support (ITLS)

C
CCP - Critical Care Paramedic (Canada)
 CCP-C Certified Critical Care Paramedic 
CCP-F - Critical Care Paramedic - Flight (Canada)
 CEMSO - Chief Emergency Medical Service Officer
 CFR - Certified First Responder
 CIC - Certified Instructor Coordinator
 CLI - Certified Lab Instructor
 C-NPT - Certified Neonatal & Pediatric Transport
CP-C - Certified Community Paramedic 
 CEP - Certified Emergency Paramedic
CEP-I - Continuing Education Program Instructor

E
 EMA - Emergency Medical Attendant 
 EMA-D - Emergency Medical Attendant - Defibrillator
 EMD - Emergency Medical Dispatcher
 EMPACT - Emergency Medical Patient: Assessment Care and Treatment
 EMR - Emergency Medical Responder
 EMSI - Emergency Medical Services Instructor
 EMT - Emergency Medical Technician
 EMT IC - Emergency Medical Technician -  Instructor Coordinator
 AEMT - Advanced Emergency Medical Technician
 Paramedic - Paramedic
 Paramedic IC - Paramedic Instructor Coordinator
 EMT-AD - Emergency Medical Technician - Automatic Defibrillator
 EMT-CC - Emergency Medical Technician - Critical Care
 EMT-CT - Emergency Medical Technician - Cardiac Tech
 EMT-M - Emergency Medical Technician - MAST (Military Anti-Shock Trousers)
 EMT-T - Emergency Medical Technician - Tactical
 EMT-ST - Emergency Medical Technician - Shock Trauma
 ERT - Emergency Room Technician
ENLS-Emergency Neurological Life Support

F
 FP-C - Certified Flight Paramedic (IBSC)
 FF-EMT - Firefighter Emergency Medical Technician
 FF-AEMT - Firefighter Advanced Emergency Medical Technician
 FF-Paramedic - Firefighter Paramedic
 FF-P - Firefighter Paramedic
 FF-NRP - Firefighter, Nationally Registered Paramedic
FTO - Field Training Officer

G
 GEMS - Geriatric Education for Emergency Medical Services
GEMS-I - Geriatric Education for Emergency Medical Services Instructor

I
 IC - Instructor/Coordinator
 ITLS Basic - Basic International Trauma Life Support Basic (previously BTLS)
 ITLS Advanced - Advanced International Trauma Life Support
 ITLS Access - Access International Trauma Life Support
 ITLS Military - Military International Trauma Life Support
 ITLS Pediatric - Pediatric International Trauma Life Support

L
 LP - Licensed Paramedic

M
 MICP - Mobile Intensive Care Unit Paramedic
 MPH - Master’s in Public Health

N
 NCEE - Nationally Credentialed EMS Educator 
 ENP - Emergency Nurse Practitioner
 NICP - Neonatal Intensive Care Paramedic
 NRAEMT - National Registry Emergency Medical Technician - Advanced
 NREMT- National Registry Emergency Medical Technician
 NRP - Nationally Registered Paramedic
 NQEMT - Pre-Hospital Emergency Care Council Emergency Medical Technician
 NQEMT-P - Pre-Hospital Emergency Care Council Paramedic
 NQEMT-AP - Pre-Hospital Emergency Care Council Advanced Paramedic

P
 PALS - Pediatric Advanced Life Support 
 PALS-I - Pediatric Advanced Life Support Instructor 
 PA-C - Physician Assistant
 PCP - Primary Care Paramedic (Canada)
 PEPP - Pediatric Education for Pre-Hospital Professionals
 PHRN - Prehospital Registered Nurse
 PHTLS - Prehospital Trauma Life Support
 PNCCT - Pediatric and Neonatal Critical Care Transport
 PMD - Paramedic

R
 RP - Registered Paramedic
 RN - Registered Nurse
 RT(R) - Registered Radiologic Technologist
 RRA - Registered Radiologist Assistant (Midlevel Provider)
 RRT - Registered Respiratory Therapist
 RRT-NPS - Registered Respiratory Therapist - Neonatal Pediatric Specialist
 RRT-ACCS - Registered Respiratory Therapist - Adult Critical Care Specialist

S
 SARTECH - Search and Rescue Technician
 SEI - Senior EMS Instructor

T
 TCCC - Tactical Combat Casualty Care
 TP-C - Certified Tactical Paramedic
 TR-C - Certified Tactical Responder

W
 WEMT - Wilderness Emergency Medical Technician
 WFR - Wilderness First Responder

See also
 List of nursing credentials

References

Emergency medical services in the United States
Medical credentials